The armies of Bohemond of Taranto, formed in 1097, include a major component of the First Crusade.  He is regarded as the real leader of the First Crusade. He formed a second army in 1107 to defend Antioch but instead used it to attack the Byzantine emperor Alexios I Komnenos, resulting in the Treaty of Devol, codifying Bohemond’s defeat. Runciman estimates that the first army included 500 cavalry and 3500 infantrymen (plus clergy and non-combatants) and other estimates that the second army was at 34,000 personnel strength are likely greatly exaggerated.

The known members of the army, mostly French, included the ones listed below, as reported in histories of the First Crusade.  Unless otherwise noted, references are to the on-line database of Riley-Smith, et al, and the hyperlinks therein provide details including original sources. The names below are also referenced in the Riley-Smith tome, Appendix I: Preliminary List of Crusaders.  Those references are not shown unless they appear elsewhere in the text of the book.  Articles that are hyperlinked to a more detailed article in this encyclopædia rely on the latter for references.  Participants are from the First Crusade unless otherwise noted.

Bohemond’s Household and Close Family 

Bohemond likely travelled with a large contingent of servants, vassals and family members.  The known ones include:
 Bohemond’s half-sister, likely Matilda, daughter of Robert Guiscard and his second wife Sikelgaita
 Guy, Duke of Amalfi and Sorrento, half-brother of Bohemond
 Mala Corona (meaning the badly crowned or ill tonsured), servant of Bohemond
 Robert of Buonalbergo, standard-bearer and constable to Bohemond.  He returned to the west at some point before 1112 and was murdered in 1121 under unknown circumstances. He was buried at the Abbey of St. Sophia in Benevento.  He first joined the Crusades under the Army of Hugh the Great.
 Tancred, nephew of Bohemond
 Ilger Bigod, Constable of Tancred.  He commanded 200 knights in the captured Jerusalem and returned with a relic of the hair of Mary, mother of Christ.
 Robert Marchisus, brother of Tancred
 William Claret, Duke of Apulia, nephew of Bohemond (1107)
 William of Normandy, Lord of Tortosa, illegitimate son of Robert Curthose (1107)
 Hermann of Cannae, cousin of Bohemond
 Rainald of Salerno, son of William of the Principate, brother of Richard of Salerno, and so related to Bohemond.

Clergy 

As with all crusader armies, a large number of clergy travelled with the combatants.  This included:
 The Bishop of Martirano, name unknown, who supported the election of Arnulf of Chocques as patriarch of Jerusalem, but died shortly after the fall of Jerusalem
 Gerard, Archbishop of York (1107)
 Maurice of Bourdin, Bishop of Coimbra (possibly later the Antipope Gregory VIII) (1107)
 Ralph of Caen, Chaplin (1107)
 Siger, Abbot of St. Peter at Ghent (1107).

Historians 

A single known historian travelled with Bohemond:
 The author of Gesta Francorum, a cleric whose name remains unknown.

Knights and other Soldiers from the First Crusade 

The following combatants under Bohemond in the First Crusade include:
 Ralph the Red of Pont-Echanfray and his wife.  Ralph’s wife, sister of Hugh I of Jaffa (see below) died during the Crusade and he later died in the White Ship disaster.
 Walchelin II (Guascelin) of Pont-Echanfray, brother of Ralph the Red
 Ralph, Count of Beaugency, married to Mathilde, daughter of Hugh the Great, Count of Vermandois
 Bertrand of Moncontour, a follower of Ralph of Beaugency
 Richard, Lord of Caiazzo and Alife, son of Ranulf I, Count of Caiazzo
 Richard, Count of Salerno, a commander at the Battle of Dorylaeum, and also with Bohemond in 1107
 Attropius, sent as an envoy to Constantinople by Tancred
 Aubrey of Cagnano, killed during the siege of Antioch
 Bartholomew Boel of Chartres
 Geoffrey of Montescaglioso
 Geoffrey of Segre, one of the first to climb the walls of Antioch
 Godric of Finchale, Sea Captain (during the Crusade of 1101)
 Guarin, sent as a messenger to Constantinople
 Herman of Hauteville
 Hugh Lo Forcenet (the Mad), who gained a reputation during the capture and defense of Antioch
 Humphrey, son of Ralph (origins unknown)
 Pagan, a Sergeant, was the first to climb the ladder in Bohemond's covert assault upon Antioch in 1098
 Peter Raymond, Lord of Hautpoul, a leading vassal of Count Raymond of Toulouse
 Rainald Porchet
 Robert of Anzi, who later joined the army of Godfrey of Bouillon after the capture of Antioch
 Robert, Lord of Collanges, who donated his estate to the priory of Marcigny-sur-Loire
 Robert of Maule, cousin of Hugh of Boissy-sans-Avoir
 Robert of Molise, Lord of Limosano, son of Tristan
 Robert of Sourdeval, Lord of Torosse
 Ruthard, son of Godfrey

Members of the House of Le Puiset (1107) 

The houses of Montlhéry and Le Puiset contributed many knights to the Crusades, including:
 Hugh II of Le Puiset (Hugh I of Jaffa) and his wife Mabel
 Richard of Le Puiset, either a brother of Hugh II (see above) or brother of Hugh’s brother-in-law
 Waleran, Lord of Villepreux, son of Hugh I of Le Puiset and Alice de Montlhéry.

Knights and Other Soldiers of the Army of 1107 

The known combatants in Bohemond’s army of 1107 include the following:
 Robert of Montfort-sur-Risle, constable of Henry I of England, likely the son of Hugh de Montfort, a proven Companion of William the Conqueror
 Aimery Andrea
 Gastinellus of Bourgueil
 Geoffrey of Mali
 Goldinellus of Curzay
 Halldor of Skaldri
 Hervey, son of Durand
 Hugh of Boissy-sans-Avoir
 Humbert, son of Ralph
 Josbert of Alboin, nephew of Peter, Abbott of Vigeois
 Joscelin of Lèves
 Josceran of Vitry
 Koprisianos
 Count Pagan
 Philip of Montoro
 Ralph Licei
 Ralph of Rabaste
 Renier of Brun
 Robert of Vipont
 Count Sarakenos
 Simon of Nouâtre
 Walter of Montsoreau, accompanied by Godfrey Brossard.

Sources 
 Riley-Smith, Jonathan, The First Crusaders, 1095-1131, Cambridge University Press, London, 1997
 Runciman, Steven, A History of the Crusades, Volume One: The First Crusade and the Foundation of the Kingdom of Jerusalem, Cambridge University Press, London, 1951
 Bury, J. B., Editor, The Cambridge Medieval History, Volume III: Germany and the Western Empire, Cambridge University Press, London, 1922
 Prof. J. S. C. Riley-Smith, Prof, Jonathan Phillips, Dr. Alan V. Murray, Dr. Guy Perry, Dr. Nicholas Morton, A Database of Crusaders to the Holy Land, 1099-1149 (available on-line)
 Gesta Francorum et aliorum Hierosolimitanorum, edited and translated by Rosalind Hill, Oxford, 1967. Latin text with facing-page English translation.
 Kostick, Conor, The Social Structure of the First Crusade, Brill, Leiden, 2008 (available on Google Books)
 Riley-Smith, Jonathan, The First Crusade and the Idea of Crusading, University of Pennsylvania Press, 1986 (available on Google Books)
 Van Houts, Elizabeth, The Normans in Europe, Manchester University Press, 2000 (available on Google Books)
 Jamison, E. M., Some Notes on the Anonymi Gesta Francorum, with Special Reference to the Norman Contingent from South Italy and Sicily in the First Crusade, in Studies in French Language and Medieval Literature, University of Manchester, 1939.

References 

Armies of the First Crusade